Thomas J. Gnat (December 2, 1936 - June 21, 2017) was a bishop of the Eastern Diocese of Polish National Catholic Church. He was born in Milwaukee, Wisconsin and attended Savonarola Theological Seminary in Scranton, Pennsylvania. He was consecrated on November 30, 1978 in Scranton and retired in 2011.

External links 
Obituary, Scranton Times-Tribune

American bishops
American Polish National Catholics
Bishops of the Polish National Catholic Church
American people of Polish descent
1936 births
2017 deaths
20th-century American clergy
21st-century American clergy